Greg Cohen (born July 13, 1953) is an American jazz bassist who has been a member of John Zorn's Masada quartet and worked with numerous other noted musicians for over four decades.

Career
Cohen plays traditional jazz and other styles, including work with Ken Peplowski, Kenny Davern, Marty Grosz, and Woody Allen. He has also worked with Tom Waits, David Byrne, Elvis Costello, Dagmar Krause, David Sanborn, Susana Baca, Gal Costa, Marisa Monte, Laurie Anderson, Willie Nelson, Bill Frisell, Norah Jones, Dave Douglas, Tricky, Jesse Harris, Keith Richards and Charlie Watts, Joey Baron, Donovan, Crystal Gayle, Bob Dylan, Nina Nastasia, Alan Watts, Lee Konitz, Richie Havens, Dino Saluzzi, Lou Reed, Marianne Faithfull, Odetta, Vesna Pisarović, Danny Barker, Tim Sparks, and Antony and the Johnsons.

In August 2006 he was musical director of the Century of Song series at the German arts festival RuhrTriennale. He invited songwriters and performers such as David Byrne, Holly Cole and Laurie Anderson.

He has been a regular member of Woody Allen and his New Orleans Jazz Band, which played at the Carlyle Hotel in Manhattan. He appeared in the documentary Wild Man Blues (directed by Barbara Kopple) about a 1996 European tour by Allen and his band. Cohen appears in Robert Altman's 1993 film Short Cuts.

Cohen is a bass professor and the head of string department at the Jazz Institute Berlin. and honorary professor in contemporary rhythmic music at SDMK - Danish National Academy of Music.

Discography

As leader
 Way Low (DIW, 1996)
 Moment to Moment (DIW, 1998)
 Golden State (Relative Pitch, 2014)

As sideman
With Laurie Anderson
 Bright Red (Warner Bros., 1994)
 Life on a String (Elektra Nonesuch, 2001)

With Elvis Costello
 Painted from Memory (Mercury Records, 1998)

With Christina Courtin
 Christina Courtin (Nonesuch Records, 2009)

With Dave Douglas
 Charms of the Night Sky (Winter & Winter, 1997)
 A Thousand Evenings (RCA, 2000)
 El Trilogy (BMG, 2001)

With Tim Sparks
 At the Rebbe's Table (Tzadik, 2002)
 Little Princess (Tzadik, 2009)

With Tom Waits
 Heartattack and Vine (Asylum, 1980)
 Swordfishtrombones (Island, 1983)
 Rain Dogs (Island, 1985)
 Franks Wild Years (Island, 1987)
 The Black Rider (Island, 1993) 
 Mule Variations (Anti, 1999)

With John Zorn
 Masada: Alef (DIW, 1994) with Masada
 Masada: Beit (DIW, 1994) with Masada
 Masada: Gimel (DIW, 1994) with Masada
 Masada: Dalet (DIW, 1994) with Masada
 Masada: Hei (DIW, 1995) with Masada
 Masada: Vav (DIW, 1995) with Masada
 Masada: Zayin (DIW, 1996) with Masada
 Bar Kokhba (Tzadik, 1996) with Bar Kokhba
 Masada: Het (DIW, 1996) with Masada
 Masada: Tet (DIW, 1997) with Masada
 Live in Jerusalem 1994 (Tzadik, 1997) with Masada
 Live in Taipei 1995 (Tzadik, 1997) with Masada
 Masada: Yod (DIW, 1997) with Masada
 The Circle Maker (Tzadik, 1998) with Bar Kokhba and Masada String Trio
 Live in Middleheim 1999 (Tzadik, 1999) with Masada
 Live in Sevilla 2000 (Tzadik, 2000) with Masada
 Live at Tonic 2001 (Tzadik., 2000) with Masada
 First Live 1993 (Tzadik, 2002) with Masada
 Filmworks XI: Secret Lives (Tzadik, 2002) with Masada String Trio
 The Unknown Masada (Tzadik, 2003)
 50th Birthday Celebration Volume 1 (Tzadik, 2003) with Masada String Trio
 50th Birthday Celebration Volume 7 (Tzadik, 2003) with Masada
 50th Birthday Celebration Volume 11 (Tzadik, 2003) with Masada String Trio
 Astaroth: Book of Angels Volume 1 (Tzadik, 2004) with the Jamie Saft Trio
 Sanhedrin 1994–1997 (Tzadik, 2005) with Masada
 Azazel: Book of Angels Volume 2 (Tzadik, 2005) with Masada String Trio
 Filmworks XX: Sholem Aleichem (Tzadik, 2008)
 Lucifer: Book of Angels Volume 10 (Tzadik, 2008) with Bar Kokhba
 Stolas: Book of Angels Volume 12 (Tzadik, 2009) with Masada Quintet
 Alhambra Love Songs (Tzadik, 2009)
 Baal: Book of Angels Volume 15 (Tzadik, 2010) with Ben Goldberg Quartet
 Haborym: Book of Angels Volume 16 (Tzadik, 2010) with Masada String Trio
 In Search of the Miraculous (Tzadik, 2010)

With Victoria Williams
 Happy Come Home (Geffen, 1987)
 Loose (Atlantic, 1994)
 Musings of a Creek Dipper (Atlantic, 1998)

With others
 Fiona Apple, When the Pawn... (Epic, 1999)
 Cyro Baptista, Vira Loucos (Avant, 1997)
 Steve Beresford, Signals for Tea (Avant, 1995)
 David Byrne, Feelings (Warner Bros., 1997)
 David Byrne, Look into the Eyeball (Virgin, 2001)
 Marc Cohn, Join the Parade (Decca, 2007)
 Holly Cole, Holly Cole (Alert, 2006)
 Anthony Coleman, Sephardic Tinge (Tzadik, 1995)
 Kenny Davern and Ken Peplowski, The Jazz KENnection (Arbors)
 Marianne Faithfull, Easy Come, Easy Go (Naive, 2008)
 Mark Feldman, Secrets with Uri Caine and Joey Baron (Tzadik, 2009)
 Michael Franks, Time Together (Shanachie, 2011)
 Keiji Haino, An Unclear Trial (Avant, 1998)
 Joe Jackson, Fast Forward (Caroline, 2015)
 Natalie Merchant, Leave Your Sleep (Nonesuch, 2010)
 Randy Newman, Bad Love (DreamWorks, 1999)
 Randy Newman, Harps and Angels (Nonesuch, 2008)
 Madeleine Peyroux, Dreamland (Atlantic, 1996)
 Marc Ribot, Shoe String Symphonettes (Tzadik, 1997)
 Jamie Saft, Trouble: The Jamie Saft Trio Plays Bob Dylan (Tzadik, 2006)
 Ron Sexsmith, Other Songs (Interscope, 1997)
 Julian Siegel, Live at The Vortex (Basho, 2008)
 Loudon Wainwright III, Social Studies (Hannibal, 1999)

References

American double-bassists
Male double-bassists
Jewish American musicians
Living people
1953 births
Musicians from Los Angeles
Musicians from Summit, New Jersey
Jewish jazz musicians
21st-century double-bassists
21st-century American male musicians
American male jazz musicians
Masada (band) members
21st-century American Jews